Menno's Mind is a 1997 film directed by Jon Kroll and starring Billy Campbell, Stephanie Romanov, Corbin Bernsen, Michael Dorn and Bruce Campbell. In the film, a computer programmer at a virtual reality resort contends with terrorists.

The screenplay was written by Mark Valenti.

External links 
 

1997 films
1990s science fiction films
Films about computing
Films scored by Christopher Franke
1990s English-language films